The 2010 National Camogie League is a competition in the women's team field sport of camogie was won by Wexford for the second year in succession. They defeated Kilkenny in the final, played at Semple Stadium.

Arrangements
The seven teams in the first division were drawn into two groups of four and three. Each team played one another once only. The top two in each group contested the semi-finals. Since 2006 the league is organized into four divisions, with 22 competing county teams graded into four divisions, with the strongest teams in Division 1.
The semi-finals were contested at O'Connor Park, Tullamore on 10 April 2010, in which Kilkenny staged a remarkable comeback to defeat Galway,.

The Final
final at Semple Stadium Thurles on Saturday, 24 April 2010, Wexford defeating Kilkenny by 1–7 to 1–6, the winning point coming from Ursula Jacob in the eighth minute of injury time, after a late goal from substitute Linda Bolger. Wexford manager JJ Doyle told the Irish Times his job should come with a health warning after the victory.

Lower Divisions
Eleven counties in Division 2 were drawn in two groups of five and six, including the second teams of Cork, Galway, Kilkenny, Tipperary and Wexford. Wexford intermediates, managed by Karen Barnes and captained by Ciara O'Connor of Rathnure, surprisingly defeated Offaly in the final by 2–9 to 1–9, the second year in succession that Wexford has simultaneously held the first and second division titles.
Six teams contested Division 3, including the second team of Dublin with Laois defeating Meath in the final, and three counties contested Division 4, including London, with Westmeath defeating Tyrone in the final.

Fixtures and results

Group A

–---

Group B

Final stages

MATCH RULES
60 minutes
Replay if scores level
Maximum of 5 substitutions

Series statistics

Scoring

Widest winning margin: 18 points
Wexford 2–17 : 0–5 Dublin
Most goals in a match: 5
Kilkenny 5–5 : 0–6 Tipperary
Widest winning margin (other divisions): 26 points
Roscommon 6–13 : 0–5 Dublin

Top Scorers Division 1
Aislinn Connolly (Galway) 1–20 23
Kate Kelly (Wexford) 2–17 23
Una Leacy (Wexford) 4–11 23
Aoife Neary (Kilkenny) 3–12 21
Veronica Curtin (Galway) 4–3 15
Ann Dalton (Kilkenny) 2–6 12
Claire Grogan (Tipperary) 0–12 12
Lenny Holohan (Wexford) 2–5 11
Fiona Kavanagh (Wexford) 2–5 11
Ciara Lucey (Dublin) 0–11 11

Division 2

GROUP 1
Feb 14 Wexford 5–8 Waterford 2–7 Fenor
Feb 14 Limerick 0–13 Down 2– 6 Ashbourne
Feb 27 Wexford 2–10 Down 1–13 Clonshaugh
Feb 28 Galway 2–10 Waterford 2–7 Athenry
Mar 6 Wexford 3–9 Galway 1–3 Enniscorthy
Mar 6 Limerick 1–10 Waterford 1–10 Kilmallock
Mar 21 Down 2–11 Galway 0–9 Clonduff
Mar 21 Wexford 3–11 Limerick 2–8 Cushinstown
Apr 4 Limerick 5–13 Galway 2–6 Limerick Gaelic Grounds
Apr 4 Waterford 3–9 Down 1–9 Blanchardstown

GROUP 2
Feb 14 Tipperary 2–10 Antrim 0–4 Swords
Feb 14 Offaly 2–13 Kilkenny 0–3 Lisdowney
Feb 14 Derry wo Cork Swords
Feb 28 Tipperary 2–12 Kilkenny 0–5 The Ragg
Feb 28 Offaly 0–15 Derry 1–6 Cooley
Feb 28 Cork 2–7 Antrim 2–7 Trim
Mar 6 Kilkenny 3–6 Cork 3–6 Mullinavat
Mar 6 Antrim 0–13 Derry 2–7 Creggan
Mar 6 Offaly 0–14 Tipperary 0–13 Banagher
Mar 14 Cork 2–12 Tipperary 1–8 CIT
Mar 14 Offaly 4–11 Antrim 5–7 St Gall's
Mar 14 Derry 3–15 Kilkenny 0–4 Blanchardstown
Apr 4 Offaly 3–14 Cork 0–10 Banagher
Apr 4 Derry 3–20 Tipperary 2–6 Blanchardstown
Antrim wo Kilkenny

Group one table

Group 2 Table

Division 2 Final
Apr 24 Wexford 2–9 Offaly 1–9 Thurles

Top scorers
Elaine Dermody (Offaly) 2–34 40
Áine Lyng (Waterford) 4–19 31
Eileen O'Brien (Limerick) 3–14 23
Sarah Louise Carr (Down) 4–10 22
Ciara O'Connor (Wexford) 2–16 22
Siobhán Flannery (Offaly) 3–11 20
Fiona Kavanagh (Wexford) 5–5 20
Gráinne McGoldrick (Derry) 0–20 20
Shannon Graham (Antrim) 3–10 19
Charlotte Kearney (Cork) 4–5 17

Division 3

Feb 7 Kildare 1–7 Dublin 0–4 Ballyboden
Feb 7 Laois 5–14 Meath 3–3 Ashbourne
Feb 14 Meath 1–9 Armagh 0–5 Ashbourne
Feb 14 Roscommon 2–5 Kildare 0–7 Celbridge
Feb 14 Laois 3–16 Dublin 0–1 Portlaoise
Feb 28 Meath 1–15 Roscommon 2–10 Ballyforan
Feb 28 Laois 4–11 Kildare 2–4 Rathdowney
Feb 28 Armagh 4–13 Dublin 0–3 Cullyhanna
Mar 6 Kildare 2–8 Meath 1–11 St Laurence's
Mar 6 Laois 5–17 Armagh 2–7 Rathdowney
Mar 7 Roscommon 6–13 Dublin 0–5 Athleague
Mar 14 Kildare 4–8 Armagh 2–12 Mullaghbawn
Mar 14 Meath 4–7 Dublin 1–4 Donaghmede
Mar 14 Laois 0–13 Roscommon 0–10 Athleague
Mar 21 Armagh 3–7 Roscommon 1–7 Tullysaran

Division 3 table

Division 3 Final
Apr 10 Laois 2–10 Meath 2–5 Tullamore'

Top scorers
Colette McSorley (Armagh) 10–28 58
Jane Dolan (Meath) 4–31 43
Kelly Hopkins (Roscommon) 5–20 35
Susie O'Carroll Kildare 2–23 29
Áine Mahony (Laois) 3–19 28
Louise Mahony (Laois) 0–27 27
Annette McGeeney (Roscommon) 4–9 21

Division 4

Feb 28 Westmeath 3–3 London 1–7 Watford
Feb 28 Tyrone 4–12 Carlow 0–7 Dungannon.
Mar 6 London 2–4 Tyrone 1–6 Watford;
Mar 14 Tyrone 2–7 Westmeath 3–3 Oliver Plunkett's Mullingar
Mar 21 Tyrone 1–12 London 1–3 Derrytresk;

Division 4 Final
Apr 11 Tyrone 3–12 Westmeath 1–9 Omagh

References

2010
National Camogie League, 2010